Valongo do Vouga is a freguesia in Águeda Municipality, Aveiro District, Portugal. The population in 2011 was 4,877, in an area of 43.20 km2.

Geography

Places
Aguieira
Aldeia
Arrancada do Vouga
Brunhido
Cadaveira
Carvalhal da Portela
Carvalhosa
Cavadas da Baixo
Cavadinhas
Espinheiros
Fermentões
Gândara
Lanheses
Lavagadas
Moutedo
Outeiro
Paço
Picadas
Póvoa do Espírito Santo
Quintã
Redonda
Sabugal
Salgueiro
Sobreiro
Toural
Val Covo
Veiga
Valongo

Demography

Elections
As of 31 December 2011, it had 4,461 registered voters.

References

External links
 

Freguesias of Águeda